Collateral ligament of elbow joint may refer to:

 Ulnar collateral ligament of elbow joint
 Radial collateral ligament of elbow joint